Bathsheba "Sheba" Nell Crocker (born 1968) is an American diplomat who is currently serving as the Representative of the United States to the European Office of the United Nations. She previously served as Assistant Secretary of State for International Organization Affairs from 2014 to 2017.

Education
Crocker received a Bachelor of Arts from Stanford University, a Master of Arts from the Fletcher School of Law and Diplomacy, and a Juris Doctor from Harvard Law School.

Career

Crocker was an International Affairs Fellow at the Council on Foreign Relations from 2002 to 2003. From 2003 to 2005, Crocker worked at the Center for Strategic and International Studies on the Post-Conflict Reconstruction Project as a fellow and co-director. Crocker was also the Deputy Chief of Staff at the Office of the UN Special Envoy for Tsunami Recovery, from 2005 to 2007. Afterwards, she was the senior advisor to the Assistant Secretary-General for Peacebuilding Support at the UN Peacebuilding Support Office, from 2007 to 2008. From 2008 to 2009, Crocker was a Senior Policy and Advocacy Officer for International Affairs at the Bill & Melinda Gates Foundation.

Crocker most recently served in several positions at the U.S. Department of State, including as a Senior Adviser to the Secretary of State, as the Principal Deputy Director in the Office of Policy Planning under Jake Sullivan, and as Chief of Staff to Deputy Secretary of State James Steinberg.

Crocker has also previously served as an attorney-adviser for the Office of the Legal Adviser of the Department of State; as deputy U.S. special representative for Southeast Europe Affairs at the U.S. Embassy in Rome, Italy; and as the executive assistant to the Deputy National Security Advisor for the National Security Council at the White House. She has also taught as an adjunct professor at Johns Hopkins University, George Washington University, and American University.

Crocker was confirmed by the United States Senate on September 18, 2014, and was sworn in as Assistant Secretary for International Organization Affairs the next day on September 19, 2014.

After leaving the Department of State in January 2017, Crocker joined CARE USA as their vice president for humanitarian policy and practice.

In November 2020, Crocker was named a volunteer member of the Joe Biden presidential transition Agency Review Team to support transition efforts related to the United States Department of State and the United States Mission to the United Nations.

Ambassador to the UN European Office
On June 24, 2021, President Joe Biden nominated Crocker to serve as the next Representative of the United States to the European Office of the United Nations. Hearings were held before the Senate Foreign Relations Committee on her nomination on September 15, 2021. The nomination was favorably reported by the committee on October 19, 2021. Crocker was confirmed by the entire Senate on December 18, 2021, via voice vote. Crocker was sworn in on December 21, 2021, and presented her credentials on January 18, 2022.

References

External links
 Sheba Crocker's contributions on DipNote
 

American University faculty and staff
American women diplomats
American diplomats
The Fletcher School at Tufts University alumni
George Washington University faculty
Harvard Law School alumni
Johns Hopkins University faculty
Living people
Stanford University alumni
United States Assistant Secretaries of State
1968 births
21st-century American diplomats
21st-century American women
Obama administration personnel